Livin' It is a Christian themed skateboarding film directed by Stephen Baldwin and executive produced by Kevin Palau.

The film was shot in Portland, Oregon and stars Stephen Baldwin and skateboarders Jud Heald, Tim Byrne, Luke Braddock, Anthony Carney, Jared Lee, Phil Trotter, and Sierra Fellers.

More than 100,000 copies of Livin' It have been distributed. It combines skateboarding footage with what Baldwin calls a real message about life.

References

External links
 

Films about evangelicalism
Films set in Oregon
Films shot in Oregon
Skateboarding films
2004 films
2000s English-language films
American sports documentary films
2000s American films